North Geelong railway station is located on the Warrnambool line in Victoria, Australia. It serves the northern Geelong suburb of North Geelong, and opened on 1 August 1883 as West Geelong. It was renamed North Geelong on 1 January 1886.

The station is located on the Geelong side of the junction of the Ballarat and Melbourne lines. The North Geelong rail yards are located north of the station.

After a rearrangement of the Ballarat line junction in 1907, the platform on the west side was removed, and all trains used the one platform. A further reorganisation in 1920 saw the second platform restored.

In 1973, the former Victoria Street level crossing, which was adjacent to the down (southern) end of the station, was replaced by the Margaret Street overpass and a pedestrian underpass. In 1976, both platforms were extended by over 60 metres, and the platforms and platform facings were renewed in 1979. The main station building on Platform 1 was opened on 8 August 1990 and, in 2008, the smaller building on Platform 2 was replaced by a metal shelter.

In January 2019, the North Geelong "C" signal box, then one of the few remaining mechanical signal boxes in Victoria, was abolished, and a project begun to automatically signal the lines it formerly controlled.

Platforms and services
North Geelong has two side platforms. It is served by V/Line Geelong line and selected Warrnambool line trains.

Platform 1:
 services to Southern Cross
 weekend services to Southern Cross

Platform 2:
 services to Geelong, South Geelong, Marshall and Waurn Ponds
 two weekend services to Warrnambool

Transport links
CDC Geelong operates two routes via North Geelong station, under contract to Public Transport Victoria:
: Geelong station – Corio Shopping Centre
: to Geelong station

References

External links
Victorian Railway Stations gallery

Railway stations in Geelong
Railway stations in Australia opened in 1883
Regional railway stations in Victoria (Australia)